The 2006 Jade Solid Gold Best Ten Music Awards Presentation (Chinese: 2006年度十大勁歌金曲頒獎典禮) was held in January 2007. It is part of the Jade Solid Gold Best Ten Music Awards Presentation series held at the Hong Kong Coliseum.

Top 10 song awards
The top 10 songs (十大勁歌金曲) of 2006 are as follows.

Additional awards

References
 Top ten songs award 2006, Tvcity.tvb.com
 Additional awards 2006, Tvcity.tvb.com

Jade Solid Gold Best Ten Music Awards Presentation, 2006